The 1978 Vermont gubernatorial election took place on November 7, 1978. Incumbent Republican Richard A. Snelling ran successfully for a second term as Governor of Vermont, defeating Democratic candidate Edwin C. Granai.  , this was the most recent Vermont gubernatorial election in which both major party candidates are now deceased.

Republican primary

Results

Democratic primary

Results

Liberty Union primary

Results

General election

Candidates
Earl S. Gardner (Liberty Union)
Edwin Granai (Democratic), state representative
Richard A. Snelling (Republican), incumbent Governor of Vermont

Results

References

Vermont
1978
Gubernatorial
November 1978 events in the United States